Leverett is an unincorporated community located in Tallahatchie County, Mississippi, United States.

Leverett is located on Leverett Lane near Mississippi Highway 35.

Leverett has a ZIP code of 38920.

References

Unincorporated communities in Tallahatchie County, Mississippi
Unincorporated communities in Mississippi